Osage is an unincorporated community in Jefferson County, in the U.S. state of Ohio.

History
A post office called Osage was established in 1890, and remained in operation until 1909. Besides the post office, Osage had a Lutheran church.

References

Unincorporated communities in Jefferson County, Ohio
Unincorporated communities in Ohio